The Lena-Angara Plateau, is a plateau in Siberia. Administratively it is in the Irkutsk Oblast, Russian Federation. The plateau is named after the Lena and Angara rivers, of which it forms the watershed. Rivers on the plateau flow mostly in a south–north direction.

The plateau has rich mining areas where iron and copper ores are extracted, as well as rock-salt, talc and mica.  The Lena-Angara Plateau is mostly sparsely populated. The biggest settlements are Ust-Kut, Kirensk, Zheleznogorsk-Ilimsky, as well as the villages of Zhigalovo and Kachug. The Bratsk Reservoir is located in the plateau area.

Geography

The Lena-Angara Plateau rises in the middle part of Irkutsk Oblast, between the Angara River to the west and the Kirenga River, a tributary of the Lena, to the east. To the northwest it is bound by the Angara Range, to the south by the Angara valley, to the southeast by the Primorsky Range, and to the east by the Baikal Range, beyond which lies Lake Baikal. 

To the north the Lena-Angara Plateau merges with the Central Siberian Plateau. This same mountain, however, is marked as a  peak in the E-8 sheet of the Defense Mapping Agency Navigation charts. The same peak is shown as a  summit in the N-48 sheet of the Soviet Topographic Map.

Hydrography
The upper course of river Lena crosses the plateau roughly from south to north. Its tributaries Kirenga, Ilga, Tutura, Tayura and Kuta join it in the plateau area. The plateau also includes highly developed karst forms such as the Botovskaya Cave.

Flora
There are taiga forests made up mostly of larch, spruce and Siberian pine in the higher areas and larch in the river valleys.

See also 
 List of mountains and hills of Russia
 Geography of Russia § Topography and drainage

References

External links
Physiogeography of the Russian Far East

Central Siberian Plateau
Landforms of Irkutsk Oblast
ru:Лено-Ангарское плато